Ramani Bharadwaj is an Indian music composer, singer-songwriter, who predominantly known for his work in Tamil cinema. He is a recipient of the Kalaimamani Award for the year 2008 from the Tamil Nadu State Government.

Early life and family 

Bharadwaj was born in Ravanasamudram, Tirunelveli District, Tamil Nadu, but spent his entire childhood in Delhi.

Career 

He as composed songs "Satham Illatha Thanimai Kaeten" (Amarkalam), "Avaravar Vazhkayil" (Pandavar Bhoomi), "O Podu" (Gemini), "Apple Penney" (Roja Koottam), "Unai Naan Unai Naan" (Jay Jay), "Gnabagam Varuthey" (Autograph), "Kaadu Thirandey, "Siruchi Siruchi Vanthan" (Vasool Raja MBBS), "Oru Vaarthai Ketka" (Ayya), "Thaiyatha Thaiyatha" (Thiruttu Payale), "Meendum Palliku Pogalam" (Pallikoodam), "Margazhiyil Kuluchiparu" (Onbadhu Roobai Nottu), "Hey Dushyantha", "Totadoing" (Asal), "Azhagazhagey" (Kalavaadiya Pozhuthugal).

Awards 

Bharadwaj was awarded the Filmfare Award twice, for his work on the films Gemini (2002) & Autograph (2004). He is also a recipient of the Kalaimamani Award for the year 2008 from the Tamil Nadu State Government.

His composition "Ovvavaru Pookalume" in the Tamil film Autograph won the National Award for Best Singer and Best Lyric writer in the year 2004.

Filmography 
Films
This is a partial list of notable films where Bharadwaj has composed music & background score

Non Film Songs

Singer
This is a partial list of notable films where Bharadwaj has worked as singer

References

External links
 

Tamil film score composers
People from Tirunelveli district
Indian male musicians
Living people
Filmfare Awards South winners
1960 births
Indian male film score composers